The Commissioner of Education of the State of New York is the head of the State Education Department, chosen by the Board of Regents. The Commissioner also serves as the President of the University of the State of New York office. Generally, the Regents set policy while the Commissioner has responsibility for carrying out policy.

List of commissioners

References

Education in New York (state)
 
New York State Education Department